This is a list of internal combustion engines manufactured by Ferrari.

Straight-2

Ferrari was rare among automobile manufacturers in attempting to build a straight-2 automobile engine.  The racing prototype never made it to production.

 Lampredi
 1955  – Tipo 116 – prototype I2 prototype 252 F1 
2,493.38 cc – 175 PS at 4,800 rpm (Bore 118 mm X Stroke 114 mm) 1,246.69 cc and 87,5 PS per cylinder 70,2 PS/litre

Straight-3

During the 90s Ferrari developed an experimental straight-3 two-stroke engine.

 Tipo F134
 1994 1347 cc – prototype

Straight-4

Lampredi designed a straight-4 engine for Formula Two use. Different versions of this engine were later used in Formula One and sports car racing.

 Lampredi
 1951 ––– 500 F2, 500 Mondial, 500 TR, 500 TRC 
 1,984.86 cc – 185 PS at 7,500 rpm (Bore 90 mm X Stroke 78 mm) 496.215 cc and 46,25 PS per cylinder 93,2 PS/litre
 1953 ––– 553 F2
 1,997.12 cc – 180 PS at 7,200 rpm (Bore 93 mm X Stroke 73.5 mm) 499.28 cc and 45 PS per cylinder 90,13 PS/litre
 1953 ––– 625 F1, 625 TF, 625 LM
 2,498.32 cc – 210-230 PS at 7,000 rpm (Bore 94 mm X Stroke 90 mm) 624.58 cc and 52.5-57.5 PS per cylinder 84-92 PS/litre
 1954 ––– 553 F1, 555 F1
 2,497.56 cc – 260 PS at 7,200 rpm (Bore 100 mm X Stroke 79.5 mm) 624.39 cc and 65 PS per cylinder 104 PS/litre
 1953 ––– 735 S
 2,941.66 cc – 225 PS at 6,800 rpm (Bore 102 mm X Stroke 90 mm) 735.41 cc and 56.25 PS per cylinder 76.5 PS/litre
 1954 ––– 750 Monza
 2,999.62 cc – 260 PS at 6,000 rpm (Bore 103 mm X Stroke 90 mm) 749.90 cc and 63.5 PS per cylinder 85 PS/litre
 1955 ––– 857 S, 860 Monza   
 3,431.94 cc – 280 PS at 6,000 rpm (Bore 102 mm X Stroke 105 mm) 857.98 cc and 70 PS per cylinder 81.6 PS/litre

Straight-6

Lampredi also modified his four into a straight-6 for racing use.

 Lampredi
 1954 – Tipo 114 – 306 S 
 2,977.29 cc – (Bore 90 mm X Stroke 78 mm) 496.215 cc per cylinder
 1955 – Tipo 118 – 376 S (118 LM)
 3,747.48 cc – 280 PS at 6,200 rpm (Bore 94 mm X Stroke 90 mm) 624.58 cc and 46.67 PS per cylinder 74.72 PS/litre
 1955 – Tipo 121 – 735 LM (121 LM)
 4,412.49 cc – 330 PS at 5,800 rpm (Bore 102 mm X Stroke 90 mm) 735.41 cc and 55 PS per cylinder 74.79 PS/litre

V6

Ferrari's Dino project of the late 1956 gave birth to the company's well-known 65° V6 DOHC engines.  This Vittorio Jano design formed the basis of the company's modern engines right up through the mid-2000s (decade). Another series of V6 engines was started in 1959 with a 60° V-angle and single overhead camshafts design.

 Dino 65° DOHC
 1957 –– Dino 156 F2    
 1,489.35 cc – 180 PS at 9,000 rpm (Bore 70 mm X Stroke 64.5 mm) 248.225 cc and 30 PS per cylinder – 120.86 PS/litre
 1958–1960 –– 246 F1/246 P F1
 2,417.34 cc – 280 PS at 8,500 rpm (Bore 85 mm X Stroke 71 mm) 402.89 cc and 46.67 PS per cylinder – 115.83 PS/litre
 1958 –– 326 MI
 3210.12 cc – 330 PS at 7,250 rpm (Bore 87 mm X Stroke 90 mm) 535.02 cc and 55 PS per cylinder – 102.8 PS/litre
 1958 –– Dino 196 S
 1983.72 cc – 195 PS at 7,200 rpm (Bore 77 mm X Stroke 71 mm) 330.62 cc and 32.5 PS per cylinder – 98.3 PS/litre
 1958 –– Dino 296 S
 2,962.092 cc – 300 PS at 7,600 rpm (Bore 85 mm X Stroke 87 mm) 493.682 cc and 50 PS per cylinder – 101.28 PS/litre
 1959 –– 256 F1
 2,474.55 cc – 295 PS at 8,600 rpm (Bore 86 mm X Stroke 71 mm) 412.425 cc and 49.17 PS per cylinder – 119.2 PS/litre
 1960 –– 156 F2
 1,476.60 cc – 185 PS at 9,200 rpm (Bore 73 mm X Stroke 58.8 mm) 246.10 cc and 30.83 PS per cylinder – 125.3 PS/litre
 1961 –– 246 SP
 2,417.34 cc – 270 PS at 8,000 rpm (Bore 85 mm X Stroke 71 mm) 402.89 cc and 45 PS per cylinder – 111.70 PS/litre
 1965 –– Dino 166 P
 1,592.58 cc – 175 PS at 9,000 rpm (Bore 77 mm X Stroke 57 mm) 265.43 cc and 29.17 PS per cylinder – 109.9 PS/litre
 1965–1969 –– Dino 206 SP, Dino 206 S, Dino 206 GT, Fiat Dino
 1,986.6 cc – 220 PS at 9.000 rpm (Bore 86 mm X Stroke 57 mm) 331.10 cc and 36.67 PS per cylinder – 110.75 PS/litre
 1967 –– Dino 166 F2
 1,596.258 cc – 200 PS at 10.000 rpm (Bore 86 mm X Stroke 45.8 mm) 266.043 cc and 33.33 PS per cylinder – 125.3 PS/litre
 1966–1968 –– 246 F1-66, Dino 246 Tasmania
 2,404.74 cc – 285 PS at 8.900 rpm (Bore 90 mm X Stroke 63 mm) 400.79 cc and 47.5 PS per cylinder – 118.52 PS/litre
 1969–1974 –– Dino 246 GT, Fiat Dino, Lancia Stratos (iron-block version developed by Franco Rocchi and Aurelio Lampredi)
 2,419.2 cc – 195 PS at 7.600 rpm (Bore 92.5 mm X Stroke 60 mm) 403.2 cc and 32.5 PS per cylinder – 80.60 PS/litre
 Dino 60° SOHC
 1959 –– Dino 196 S
 1,983.72 cc – 195 PS at 7,800 rpm (Bore 77 mm X Stroke 71 mm) 330.62 cc and 32.5 PS per cylinder – 98.3 PS/litre
 1959–1960 –– Dino 246 S
 2,417.34 cc – 250 PS at 7,500 rpm (Bore 85 mm X Stroke 71 mm) 402.89 cc and 41.67 PS per cylinder – 103.42 PS/litre
 1962 –– 196 SP
 1,983.72 cc – 210 PS at 7,500 rpm (Bore 77 mm X Stroke 71 mm) 330.62 cc and 35 PS per cylinder – 105.86 PS/litre
 1962 –– 286 SP
 2,862.78 cc – 260 PS at 6,800 rpm (Bore 90 mm X Stroke 75 mm) 477.13 cc and 43.33 PS per cylinder – 90.82 PS/litre
 Chiti 120°
 1961–1962 –– 156 F1
 1,476.6 cc – 190 PS at 9,500 rpm (Bore 73 mm X Stroke 58.8 mm) 246.10 cc and 31.67 PS per cylinder – 128.674 PS/litre
 1963–1964 –– 156 F1-63
 1,476.6 cc – 205 PS at 10,500 rpm (Bore 73 mm X Stroke 58.8 mm) 246.10 cc and 34.17 PS per cylinder – 138.85 PS/litre
 Tipo 021, 031 & 032 (120° V angle) – designed by Mauro Forghieri and Nicola Materazzi
 1980–1986 1496 cc turbocharged – Ferrari 126C, Ferrari 156/85, Ferrari F1-86
 Tipo 033 (90° V angle) – designed by Jean-Jacques His
 1987–1988 1496 cc turbocharged – Ferrari F1-87, Ferrari F1-87/88C
 Tipo 059 (90° V angle) – designed by Luca Marmorini
 2014–2015 1598 cc –– turbocharged – Ferrari F14 T, Ferrari SF15-T, Marussia MR-03, Marussia MR-03B, Sauber C33, Sauber C34
 Tipo 061 (90° V angle, 1600 cc turbocharged)
 2016 – Ferrari SF16-H, Haas VF-16, Sauber C35
2017 – Sauber C36
 Tipo 062 (90° V angle, 1600 cc turbocharged)
 2017 – Ferrari SF70H, Haas VF-17
2018 (062 EVO) – Sauber C37, Haas VF-18, Ferrari SF71H
 Tipo 064 (90° V angle, 1600 cc turbocharged)
 2019 – Ferrari SF90, Alfa Romeo C38, Haas VF-19
 Tipo 065 (90° V angle, 1600 cc turbocharged)
 2020 (065) – Ferrari SF1000, Alfa Romeo C39, Haas VF-20
 2021 (065/6) – Ferrari SF21, Alfa Romeo C41, Haas VF-21
 Tipo F163 (120° V angle, turbocharged)
 2022  2,992.4 cc – Ferrari 296 GTB

V8

The first Ferrari V8 engine was derived from a Lancia project, used in D50 F1 racecar.
The Dino V8 family lasted from the early 1970s through 2004 when it was replaced by a new Ferrari/Maserati design.

 Lancia derived (Jano)
 1955 2488 cc – DS50
 1956 2485 cc – DS50, 801
 1957 2499 cc – 801
 Chiti
 1962 –– Tipo 199 – 248 SP
 2458.70 cc – 250 PS at 7,400 rpm (Bore 77 mm X Stroke 66 mm) 307.337 cc and 31.25 PS per cylinder – 101.68 PS/litre
 1962 –– Tipo 202 – 268 SP
 2644.96 cc – 265 PS at 7,000 rpm (Bore 77 mm X Stroke 71 mm) 330.62 cc and 33.125 PS per cylinder – 100.19 PS/litre
 Tipo 205/B (designed by Franco Rocchi and Angelo Bellei)
 1964–1965 –– 158 F1
 1489.23 cc – 210 PS at 11,000 rpm (Bore 67 mm X Stroke 52.8 mm) 186.15 cc and 26.25 PS per cylinder – 141 PS/litre
 Dino
 1973–1983 –– 308 GT4, 308 GTB/GTS
 2926.9 cc – 255 PS at 7,700 rpm (Bore 81 mm X Stroke 71 mm) 365.86 cc and 31.875 PS per cylinder – 86.83 PS/litre
 1975–1981 –– 208 GT4, 208 GTB/GTS
1990.63 cc – 170 PS (for 208 GT4) or 155 PS (for 208 GTB/GTS models) at 7,700 rpm (Bore 66.8 mm X Stroke 71 mm) 248.83 cc and 21.25 PS per cylinder – 85.4 PS/litre
 1982–1989 1990 cc turbocharged –– 208 GTB/GTS Turbo, GTB/GTS Turbo
 1984–1985 2855 cc turbocharged –– Tipo F114B – 288 GTO (designed by Nicola Materazzi)
 1980–1982 2926 cc fuel injection –– 308 GTBi/GTSi, Mondial 8
 1982–1985 2926 cc quattrovalvole –– 308 GTB/GTS qv, Mondial qv
 1985–1989 3185 cc –– 328 GTB/GTS, 3.2 Mondial
 1987–1988 2936 cc turbocharged –– Tipo F120A – F40(designed by Nicola Materazzi)
 1989–1995 3405 cc –– Mondial t, 348 tb/ts, GTB/GTS, Spider
 1994–1999 3496 cc 5-valve –– F355 GTB, GTS, Spider
 1999–2004 3586 cc 5-valve –– 360 Modena, Spider, Challenge Stradale
 Tipo F136 Ferrari/Maserati engine
 2001–2019 4244 cc –– Maserati Coupé, Maserati Spyder, Maserati Quattroporte V, Maserati GranTurismo
 2004–2009 4308 cc –– F430
 2007–2019 4691 cc –– Maserati Quattroporte V, Maserati GranTurismo, Alfa Romeo 8C Competizione
 2008–2014 4297 cc –– California
 2009–2015 4499 cc –– 458
 Tipo 056 (F1 engine) (designed by Gilles Simon)
 2006–2013 2398 cc ––  248 F1, F2007, F2008, F60, F10, 150° Italia, F2012, F138, Force India VJM01, Red Bull RB2, Spyker F8-VII/VIIB, Toro Rosso STR2/2B, STR3, STR4, STR5, STR6, STR7, STR8, Sauber C29, C30, C31, C32
 Tipo F154 (turbocharged)
 2013–present 3797 cc –– Maserati Quattroporte GTS/Trofeo, Maserati Levante GTS/Trofeo, Maserati Ghibli Trofeo
 2014–present 3855 cc –– California T, GTC4Lusso T, Portofino, Roma
 2015–present 3902 cc –– 488, F8
 2020–present 3990 cc –– SF90 Stradale

V10
Ferrari used V10 engines only for F1 racecars, between 1996 and 2005.

 75°
 1996–1997 2998 cc – F310, F310B
 80°
 1998–1999 2997 cc – F300, F399
 90°
 2000–2005 2997 cc – F1-2000, F2001, F2002, F2003-GA, F2004, F2005

V12

Ferrari is best known for its V12 engines.

 Colombo (60° V angle)
 1947 1497 cc – 125 S
 1947 1903 cc – 159 S
 1947–1953 1995 cc – 166
 1948–1950 1497 cc supercharged – 125 F1
 1949–1952 1995 cc supercharged – 166 FL
 1950–1951 2341 cc – 195
 1950–1953 2563 cc – 212
 1952 2714 cc – 225 S
 1952–1954 2953 cc – 250 S, 250 MM
 1954 2953 cc – Tipo 117/107 – 250 Monza
 1954–1956 2953 cc – Tipo 112 – 250 Europa GT
 1956–1963 2953 cc – Tipo 128 – 250 GT Coupé, 250 GT LWB/GTE
 1959–1964 2953 cc – Tipo 168 – 250 GT SWB/GTO/GTL
 1959–1964 3967 cc – Tipo 163 – 400 Superamerica, 330 TRI/LM, 330 LMB
 1964–1966 4962 cc – Tipo 208 – 500 Superfast
 1964–1967 3286 cc – Tipo 213 – 275 GTB/GTS
 1966–1968 3967 cc – Tipo 209 – 330 America, 330 GTC
 1967–1968 3286 cc – Tipo 226 – 275 GTB/4
 1966–1976 4390 cc – 365, 365 GTC/4, Daytona
 1969–1970 2991 cc – Ferrari 312 P 
 1976–1984 4823 cc – 400
 1985–1989 4943 cc – 412
 Lampredi (60° V angle)
 1950 3322 cc – 275 S, 275 F1
 1950–1953 4101 cc – 340 F1, 340/342 America, 340 Mexico/MM
 1950–1954 4493 cc – 375 F1/375 MM
 1952 4382 cc – 375 Indianapolis
 1953–1955 4522 cc – 375 America/375 MM
 1953 2963 cc – 250 Europa
 1954 4954 cc – 375 Plus
 1955–1959 4962 cc – 410 S, 410 Superamerica
 Jano (60° V angle) – designed by Vittorio Jano, Vittorio Bellentani and Alberto Massimino
 1956 3490 cc – Tipo 130 – 290 MM
 1957 3490 cc – Tipo 136 – 290 S
 1957 3783 cc – Tipo 140 – 315 S
 1957 2953 cc – Tipo 142 – 312 S
 1957–1958 4023 cc – Tipo 141 – 335 S, 412 MI, 412 S
 3.5L F1 engines (65° V angle)
 1989–1994 3500 cc – Ferrari 640, Ferrari 641, Ferrari 642, Ferrari 643,  Ferrari F92A, Ferrari F93A, Ferrari 412 T1
 3.5/3.0L F1 engines (75° V angle)
 1994 3500 cc – Ferrari 412 T1
 1995 3000 cc – Ferrari 412 T2
 Tipo F116 & F133 (65° V angle)
 1992–2001 5474 cc – 456/456 M, 550 Maranello/ 550 Barchetta Pininfarina
 2002–2011 5748 cc – 575M Maranello/ Superamerica, 612 Scaglietti
 Ferrari iron block (Tipo F130 and F310) (65° V angle)
 1994–1999 –– 333 SP
 3,997.12 cc – 650 PS at 11,000 rpm (Bore 85 mm X Stroke 58.7 mm) 333.1 cc and 54.17 PS per cylinder – 162.62 PS/litre
 1995–1997 –– F50, F50 GT
 4,698.49 cc – 749 PS at 10,500 rpm (Bore 85 mm X Stroke 69 mm) 391.54 cc and 62,42 PS per cylinder – 159.42 PS/litre
 Tipo F140 (65° V angle)
 2003–2012 5998 cc – Enzo Ferrari, 599 GTB Fiorano/ 599 GTO, Maserati MC12
 2005–present 6262 cc – FF, GTC4Lusso, F12berlinetta/F12tdf, LaFerrari
 2017–present 6496 cc – 812, Daytona SP3

Flat-12 

Mauro Forghieri-designed racing flat-12s
 1964–1965 1490 cc – Tipo 207 – 512 F1
 1969 1991 cc – Tipo 232 – 212 E Montagna
 1970–1974 2992 cc – Tipo 001 – Ferrari 312B series
 1971–1973 2992 cc – Tipo 001 – Ferrari 312PB
 1975–1980 2992 cc – Tipo 015 – Ferrari 312T series
 Roadgoing flat-12s, designed by Giuliano de Angelis and Angelo Bellei
 1971–1976 4390 cc – Tipo F102A – 365 GT4 BB
 1976–1981 4942 cc – Tipo F102B – 512 BB
 1981–1984 – Tipo F110A – 512 BBi
 1984–1991 – Tipo F113A/B – Testarossa
 1991–1994 – Tipo F113D – 512 TR
 1994–1996 – Tipo F113G – F512 M

See also
 Ferrari
 List of Ferrari road cars
 List of Ferrari competition cars

References

Ferrari
Ferrari